Rags are student-run charitable fundraising organisations that are widespread in the United Kingdom and Ireland. Some are run as student societies whilst others sit with campaigns within their student unions. Most universities in the UK and Ireland, as well as some in the Netherlands and the Commonwealth countries of South Africa and Singapore have a Rag. In some universities Rags are known as Charities Campaigns, Charity Appeals, Charity Committees, Jool or Karnivals, but they all share many attributes.

In the UK, the National Student Fundraising Association (NaSFA), set up in December 2011, exists as a support and resource sharing organisation run by those managing rags for others managing Rags.

Origins

	
The Oxford English Dictionary states that the origin of the word "Rag" is from "An act of ragging; esp. an extensive display of noisy disorderly conduct, carried on in defiance of authority or discipline", and provides a citation from 1864, noting that the word was known in Oxford before this date. Early Rag collectors may have ragged passers-by until they made a donation.

Alternatively, it is thought to be from the Victorian era when students took time out of their studies to collect rags to clothe the poor.

Much more recently, backronyms have been invented for RAG to stand for "Raise and Give", "Raise A Grand" or "Raising and Giving"; these were, purportedly, coined to convince a manager in a large charity of the value of working with student fundraisers.

The first Rag in South Africa was started at the University of Pretoria in 1925. The students took to the streets in parade that still exists today and is known as the Procession. During this parade, where they build floats, they carry cans and ask the spectating public to make donations. Today RAGs held at Afrikaans universities is called JOOL.  The acronym (Jou Onbaatsugtige Opoffering vir Liefdadigheid) is translated from Afrikaans as "Your selfless sacrifice for charity".  The annual JOOL/RAG week is held at the start of every academic year and serves also as a kind of welcoming party to students of the university.

Fundraising

Rag Week

Traditionally fundraising activities have centred on an annual Rag Week, with events each day for the week. While some Rags are only active for this week, others use "Rag Week" as their flagship week to encourage participation for the whole year.

Rag Mag
A Rag mag is a small booklet traditionally filled with politically incorrect humour which was originally sold to the local community during Rag Week. Some university Rags with a strong local tradition still sell their Rag Mags, however the majority of others use theirs more as information-tools for new students wanting to know more about Rag.

A number of Rags claim to have published the first ever Rag mags:

Sheffield University Rag's Twikker was first produced in 1925.  Manchester University published a Rag mag in 1924.  An issue of a Rag mag dating from 1923, called "Goblio", is in the archives of the University of Southampton. However, Queen's University Belfast holds the most complete set of Rag magazines in its archives, holding 81 different copies of PTQ (Pro Tanto Quid – taken from the city's motto "Pro tanto quid retribuamus") from 1927 onwards.

Sponsored challenges and fundraising events

Many Rags raise the majority of their money for charity through sponsored challenges and fundraising events. While these vary from University to University, typical examples of each include:

Sponsored challenges
 "Jailbreaks", competitions to get as far from the start and back again within a set period of time, without spending any money on transport.
 Sponsored skydives
 Running events including marathons, half marathons and 'Tough Guy' challenges
 Climbing expeditions
 Sponsored hitch-hikes
 other sponsored game of sports

Fundraising events
 Pub crawls
 International Men's Day parties
 World record attempts
 Bed-runs racing teams with hospital beds.
 Pub Quizzes
 Duck races

Manchester RAG also run one of the longest running sponsored events in the North West, known as The Bogle Stroll, which celebrated its semicentennial anniversary in 2011.

Exeter RAG hold the Biggest World AIDS Day event in the UK, called the Safer Sex Ball, Seeing Thousands of students attending to raise money for Charity, £20,000 of which is annually set aside for local AIDS charity the Eddistone Trust.

Rag Raids

Street Collections: Currently known as 'Raids', volunteer collectors go out into the streets (often in costume) to collect for a specific charity on any given day with buckets rather than the clipboards.
 
Many Rags also organise week-long 'Tours' over the university holidays in which they will travel from town to town, collecting in each one, and raising thousands of pounds for the beneficiary charity.

Megaraids: A Megaraid is defined as a Raid where more than one Rag is present and in recent years these have been organised on a massive scale by charities with some events taking place consistently for over a decade. Charities which have a developed student fundraising events include Barnardo's, Cancer Research UK, Help the Aged, Hope for Children, Kidscan, Meningitis UK, Meningitis Research Foundation, Meningitis Trust and Worldwide Cancer Research. All Megaraids tend to include a social aspect and often attract former students who still take part.

Carnival RAG, the University of Birmingham's RAG, is one of the largest and most successful in the country, averaging over £200,000 a year for the last 3 years.

National Student Fundraising Association (NaSFA)
NaSFA is an association of UK student fundraising organisations. It stands for National Student Fundraising Association and was born out of a meeting of 15 heads of UK RAG organisations at the national Rag conference in Durham 2011. These presidents identified a real potential for dramatic increases in efficiency by sharing knowledge and resources. They lay down some fundamental principles, realised a need for a constant and impartial 3rd party facilitator and duly chose the NUS from a selection of applications to support the project.

The underlying aims of NaSFA, to foster sharing of resources, knowledge and support for and between student fundraising organisations have contributed to the 30 Rags involved.
In December 2011 the original NaSFA founders invited interested parties to an open meeting at the Union of Brunel Students, to ask for approval on what they had been working on and to give Ed Marsh, the Vice-President of the NUS, a mandate to drive NUS support forwards through the organisation's structure.

Rag Conference (UK)
An annual conference for Rag societies and charities is held in the UK. The conference is an opportunity for Rags, student fundraising organisations, charities and associated partners to come together to network, learn and socialise over three action-packed days. In 2012 the Rag conference was held at Loughborough University, and in 2013, the Rag conference was hosted by The University of Birmingham from the 2 to 5 September. In 2014, the conference was held at the University of York from 26–28 August. In 2019 it is due to be held in Birmingham after Carnival Rag won the bidding.

See also
Shinerama, an annual and traditional cross-Canadian university fundraising campaign functioning similarly to the UK's Rag Week tradition

References

External links
London students in traditional Rag 1940–49

Student societies in the United Kingdom
Charity in the United Kingdom